Jaime Ortiz-Patiño (20 June 1930 – 3 January 2013) was an art collector, golf course owner and former President of the World Bridge Federation.

Ortiz-Patiño was born on 20 June 1930 in Paris. His father Jorge Ortiz-Linares was Ambassador of Bolivia to France and his mother Graziella Patiño was the daughter of Bolivian industrialist Simón Patiño. In his youth, Ortiz-Patiño was educated at Le Rosey and competed in several tennis tournaments including the French Open.

Ortiz-Patiño served as the final President of Patiño Mining Company until 1982. 

Ortiz-Patiño died on 3 January 2013 in Spain.

Bridge
Ortiz-Patiño was a top international player, representing Switzerland, where he lived for many years, twice in the World Team Olympiad, and once each in the World Open Pairs, the Rosenblum Cup and the World Senior Pairs, becoming a World Bridge Federation World Life Master. He also played in eight European Championships and won many Swiss national titles.

He was President of the World Bridge Federation from 1976 to 1986.

Golf
Ortiz-Patino acquired Valderrama Golf Club in 1984. He took a lifelong interest in course maintenance and trained himself to the point where he oversaw day-to-day greenkeeping of Valderrama. In 1999, he received the Golf Course Superintendents Association of America’s Old Tom Morris Award, the maintenance industry’s highest honor.

Valderrama became a masterpiece and his legacy, ultimately hosting the 32nd Ryder Cup in 1997.

References

External links 
 

  [temporary here, as the auto-generated WorldCat link below is not yet active 2015-01-31]

1930 births
2013 deaths
Sportspeople from Paris
Contract bridge administrators
Golf course architects
Swiss contract bridge players
Alumni of Institut Le Rosey